Gnorismoneura is a genus of moths belonging to the subfamily Tortricinae of the family Tortricidae.

Species
Gnorismoneura brunneochroa Razowski, 2008
Gnorismoneura calyptrimorpha Razowski, 2008
Gnorismoneura chyta Razowski, 2008
Gnorismoneura cylindrata Wang Li & Wang, 2004
Gnorismoneura elegantica Razowski, 2008
Gnorismoneura exulis Issiki & Stringer, 1932
Gnorismoneura grandiprocessa Wang Li & Wang, 2004
Gnorismoneura hoshinoi (Kawabe, 1964)
Gnorismoneura maichau Razowski, 2008
Gnorismoneura mesoloba (Meyrick in Caradja & Meyrick, 1937)
Gnorismoneura mesotoma (Yasuda, 1975)
Gnorismoneura micronca (Meyrick, 1937)
Gnorismoneura monofascia Razowski, 2008
Gnorismoneura orientis (Filipjev, 1962)
Gnorismoneura prochyta (Meyrick, 1908)
Gnorismoneura quadrativalvata Wang Li & Wang, 2004
Gnorismoneura serrata Wang Li & Wang, 2004
Gnorismoneura silvatica Razowski, 2008
Gnorismoneura stereomorpha (Meyrick, in Caradja, 1931)
Gnorismoneura taeniodesma (Meyrick, 1934)
Gnorismoneura tragoditis (Meyrick, in Caradja & Meyrick, 1935)
Gnorismoneura vallifica (Meyrick, in Caradja & Meyrick, 1935)
Gnorismoneura zetessima Razowski, 1977
Gnorismoneura zyzzogeton Razowski, 1977

See also
List of Tortricidae genera

References

 , 1932, Stylops 1: 134.
 ,2005 World Catalogue of Insects 5

External links
tortricidae.com

Archipini
Tortricidae genera